"Fell in Love with an Alien" is a song by European-American pop group The Kelly Family. It was produced by Kathy Kelly and Paddy Kelly for their ninth studio album Almost Heaven (1996), featuring lead vocals by both siblings. The song was released as the album's third single in the first quarter of 1997 and reached the top five of the Dutch Singles Chart.

Track listings

Charts

Weekly charts

Year-end charts

References

External links
 KellyFamily.de — official site

1996 songs
The Kelly Family songs